Neil Biswas (born 1971) is a British screenwriter, playwright and director best known for his non-fictional TV drama Bradford Riots, which he wrote and directed. Bradford Riots, a film that tells the story of 2001 riots from the perspective of an Asian family, was broadcast on Channel 4 in 2006 to great acclaim, winning the Arts Council England Decibel Award.

Career
His stage-plays include Crash (Croydon Warehouse), Skirmishes (Etcetera), Overhear (National Tour – Leicester Haymarket, Bristol New Vic, Brixton Shaw) and Skin (Soho Theatre Company). He has also written for BBC Radio Four, The Royal Court YPT, English National Opera and Tara Arts.

Biswas has co-written the Talkback Productions' ten-part adaptation of In a Land of Plenty (screened on BBC2 in 2000). He also wrote the TV serials Second Generation for Channel 4 and the mini-series, The Take which ran on Sky 1, and directed two episodes of Skins (UK TV series). He has written an episode of the fantasy series Sinbad. He has also co-written and directed his original feature film Darkness Visible.

Biswas is the co-creator, lead writer and co-executive producer for Stan Lee's Lucky Man, which screened in January 2016. It was Sky 1’s highest rated original drama series ever.

Personal life
Neil Biswas is married to Manjinder Virk. They met on the set of the TV drama Bradford riots in 2007. As of 2021, he, his wife, and two children live in Dulwich, South London.  He is kind of teetotal.

Filmography

Awards and nominations
Neil Biswas received BAFTA's Break-Through Talent in 2007 for his made-for-television movie Bradford Riots.

References

External links
Neil Biswas on IMDB

Living people
1971 births
British television writers
British male screenwriters
British science fiction writers
British dramatists and playwrights
British male dramatists and playwrights
British male television writers
British film directors
British people of Indian descent